V. Chenthamarakshan is an Indian politician who was the member of 13th Kerala Legislative Assembly. He belongs to Communist Party of India (Marxist) and represented Nemmara constituency in that term. He was previously elected to Kerala Legislative Assembly in 2001 and 2006 from the erstwhile Kollengode constituency.

Political life
He started his political life as the member of Students Federation of India. He was the president and secretary of S.F.I in Palakkad district. He served as the secretary of D.Y.F.I, Palakkad district. He is now a member of CPI (M) District Committee, Palakkad.

Personal life
He was born on 27 March 1960 at Kavassery. He is the son of A.V. Vellandy and Janaky. He has a bachelor's degree in arts. He is married to Geetha K.

References

Members of the Kerala Legislative Assembly
Communist Party of India (Marxist) politicians from Kerala
1960 births
Living people